A Real Man may refer to:

A track on Sleater-Kinney (album), a 1995 studio album by the American rock band Sleater-Kinney
 A Real Man (film), a 1940 Swedish comedy film
What a Man (1943 film), an Argentine romantic drama film

See also 
 Real Man (disambiguation)
 What a Man (disambiguation)